Angelo Dominic "Archi" Cianfrocco (born October 6, 1966) is an American former professional baseball player. He played all or parts of seven seasons in Major League Baseball (MLB), mostly at first and third base, from 1992 to 1998.

Career
Cianfrocco was drafted twice, first by the Pittsburgh Pirates in the 11th round (259th overall) of the 1986 amateur entry draft, then by the Montreal Expos in the 5th round (122nd overall) of the 1987 amateur entry draft. He elected not to sign with Pittsburgh, but after one season of college baseball at Purdue, he signed with Montreal in 1987. After his MLB career, Cianfrocco played a season in Nippon Professional Baseball (NPB) for the Seibu Lions.

While playing for the Padres, he had multiple fan clubs, including "Archi's Army" and the "CianfrocCrew".  On Hall of Fame Weekend on August 4, 1997, he won the Home Run Derby in Cooperstown.

Cianfrocco was the Padres' batter facing Tom Browning when the Cincinnati Reds pitcher broke his arm while delivering a pitch.

He currently resides in San Diego, California, and is the OEM Sales Manager at Seagate Systems.

References

External links

1966 births
Living people
American expatriate baseball players in Canada
American expatriate baseball players in Japan
Baseball players from New York (state)
Harrisburg Senators players
Indianapolis Indians players
Jacksonville Expos players
Jamestown Expos players
Las Vegas Stars (baseball) players
Major League Baseball first basemen
Major League Baseball third basemen
Mayos de Navojoa players
Montreal Expos players
Nippon Professional Baseball first basemen
Nippon Professional Baseball third basemen
Onondaga Lazers baseball players
Ottawa Lynx players
Purdue Boilermakers baseball players
Rockford Expos players
San Diego Padres players
Seibu Lions players
Sportspeople from Rome, New York
American expatriate baseball players in Mexico